Milan Milovanović (born August 7, 1991) is a Serbian professional basketball player who last played for Borac Čačak of the ABA League.

Professional career
At the junior level Milovanović won the 2009 Nike International Junior Tournament with KK FMP. He later made his professional debut with FMP during the 2010–11 season. For the 2011–12 season he moved to Radnički FMP. In the 2012–13 season he played for Crvena zvezda.

On September 27, 2013, he signed with  Vojvodina Srbijagas. On December 15, 2013, he left Vojvodina and signed with Mega Vizura for the rest of the 2013–14 season.

On July 23, 2014, he signed with Bulgarian club Balkan Botevgrad for the 2014–15 season.

In May 2016, he signed with Konstantin for the 2016 Serbian Super League season.

On July 25, 2016, Milovanović signed with Romanian club Phoenix Galați. On December 12, 2016, he left Galați after appearing in eleven games. Three days later, he signed with Slovakian club Prievidza. On March 7, 2017, he was released by Prievidza. Four days later he returned to Serbia and signed with Borac Čačak for the rest of the season.

On June 29, 2017, Milovanović signed with Polish club Polpharma Starogard Gdański.

On July 31, 2019, Milovanović has signed with Anwil Włocławek of the PLK.

On November 11, 2019, Milovanović has signed with Legia Warszawa of the Polish Basketball League.

On August 31, 2020, Milovanović has signed with Krka of the Slovenian League. Milovanović averaged 5.0 points and 2.9 rebounds per game. On October 10, 2021, he signed with Denain Voltaire Basket in the LNB Pro B. On September 27, 2022, Milovanović signed with Borac Čačak of the ABA League. He parted ways with Borac in January 2023.

Serbian national team
Milovanović has been a member of the junior national teams of Serbia. With the Serbia under-20 national team he played at the 2011 FIBA Europe Under-20 Championship in Spain. He also played at the 2015 Summer Universiade in Gwangju.

References

External links
 ABA League profile
 Eurobasket.com profile
 Fiba.com profile

1991 births
Living people
ABA League players
Basketball League of Serbia players
Basketball players from Niš
BC Balkan Botevgrad players
BC Prievidza players
Centers (basketball)
KK Borac Čačak players
KK Crvena zvezda players
KK FMP (1991–2011) players
KK Krka players
KK Mega Basket players
KK Radnički FMP players
KK Vojvodina Srbijagas players
Legia Warsaw (basketball) players
Serbian expatriate basketball people in Bulgaria
Serbian expatriate basketball people in Poland
Serbian expatriate basketball people in Romania
Serbian expatriate basketball people in Slovenia
Serbian men's basketball players